Niu Maosheng (born 1939) is an ethnic Manchu People's Republic of China politician.

Biography
He was born in Beijing. He was governor of Hebei. He was minister of water resources (1993–1998). He was a delegate to the 9th National People's Congress.

References

1939 births
Living people
China Agricultural University alumni
Manchu politicians
People's Republic of China politicians from Beijing
Chinese Communist Party politicians from Beijing
Governors of Hebei
Ministers of Water Resources of the People's Republic of China
Delegates to the 9th National People's Congress
Members of the Standing Committee of the 10th Chinese People's Political Consultative Conference